Racing Bart Mampaey (formerly Juma Racing) is a racing team based in Mechelen, Belgium that runs the BMW Team RBM operation in the Deutsche Tourenwagen Masters. Previously the team had been racing in the European Touring Car Championship and World Touring Car Championship.

History

The team was formed as Juma Racing in 1974 by Julien Mampaey, the father of current team principal Bart Mampaey. Among their achievements were three wins with BMW in the Spa 24 Hours, in 1977, 1982 and 1983.

Bart Mampaey went on to create his own RBM team in 1994 which started competing in the BMW Compact Cup. They finished first and second in the Group N Spa 24 Hours in 1997, and ran the BMW Fina Bastos Team to overall victory in 1998, with Marc Duez, Eric van de Poele and Alain Cudini.

European Touring Car Championship
Team RBM started racing in the European Touring Car Championship in 2002, fielding a BMW 320i for Swede Fredrik Ekblom under the name BMW Team Belgium, who scored three podiums and finished sixth in the standings. Andy Priaulx joined the team for 2003 and the team claimed three race wins under the new banner of BMW Team UK. Priaulx went on to win the drivers title the following year, when it ran a second 320i for Kurt Mollekens under the BMW Team Belgium-Luxembourg banner.

World Touring Car Championship
The ETCC became the WTCC in 2005 and Priaulx became world champion, before successfully defending his crown again in 2006 and 2007. Occasionally the team has run a second car, once for Dutchman Duncan Huisman at Macau in 2005, for Dane Jan Magnussen at Macau in 2006 and for Swede Fredrik Ekblom at Anderstorp, Monza and Macau in 2007. In 2010, BMW scaled down to a two car effort, with Andy Priaulx and Augusto Farfus driving. At the end of 2010 BMW Motorsport stopped its WTCC commitment to focus on its DTM return.

RBM was responsible for the design, development and construction of 52 cars for the MINI Challenge, together with the production of numerous MINI Challenge kits for the Belgian, Luxembourg, German and other international MINI championships.

Deutsche Tourenwagen Masters

At the end of 2010 BMW announced that it would return in the DTM for the 2012 season. RBM was part of the building and developing of the new BMW M3 DTM before running a pair of them in 2012. The two drivers for the season were Augusto Farfus and Andy Priaulx, who both had previously been driving for RBM in the WTCC. At the penultimate round of the season in Valencia Farfus scored the first win for the team. He finished seventh in the final drivers’ standings, as second of the BMW drivers, collecting the unofficial title of ‘Rookie of the Year’. During the 2013 season Farfus was able to collect three wins and 5 podiums which allowed him to finish second in the drivers’ standings. That season RBM also managed to finish runner-up in the teams’ classification. From 2017 on BMW decided to reduce the number of cars it entered to 6 distributed over two teams. Therefore, both BMW Team RBM and BMW Team RMG entered a third car under the BMW Team RMR banner. Between 2014 and 2019 RBM scored five more wins as well as several more podiums in the DTM.

Results & Achievements

Complete Deutsche Tourenwagen Masters results
(key)

*  Season still in progress.
† Driver did not finish, but completed 75% of the race distance.

External links

Profile of Team RBM by BMW Car Club (GB) South East Region
Profile at fiawtcc.com
Team RBM at andypriaulx.com
Profile at BMW Motorsport

Belgian auto racing teams
World Touring Car Championship teams
Deutsche Tourenwagen Masters teams
Super GT teams
BMW in motorsport
Auto racing teams established in 1994